Tarantulidae is a family of arachnids belonging to the order Amblypygi.

Genera:
 Acanthophrynus Kraepelin, 1899
 Paraphrynus Moreno, 1940
 Phrynus Lamarck, 1801

References

Amblypygi
Arachnid families